The 2003 NAIA Football Championship Series concluded on December 20, 2003 with the championship game played at Jim Carroll Stadium in Savannah, Tennessee.  The game was won by the Carroll Fighting Saints over the Northwestern Oklahoma State Rangers by a score of 41–28.

Tournament bracket

  ** denotes Double OT.

References

 
NAIA Football National Championship
Carroll Fighting Saints football
Northwestern Oklahoma State Rangers football
December 2003 sports events in the United States
NAIA football